"Sea Surface full of Clouds" is a poem from the second, 1931,
edition of Wallace Stevens's first book of poetry,
Harmonium. It was first
published in 1924, so it is restricted by copyright. However, brief
parts of it are quoted here as fair use, and the whole poem is available elsewhere
on the Internet.

Overview

The poem comprises five sections, each of six tercets, describing the same seascape as viewed from the deck of a ship. Each section repeats the description in different terms but uses recurring words (slopping, chocolate, umbrellas, green, blooms, etc.) and often the same syntax. In each section the last line of the fourth tercet is written in French. Rhymes are used in somewhat changing patterns, but the final line of each section always rhymes with the final line of the preceding tercet. Essentially the poem is structured as a set of variations on a theme.

Section III, quoted here, figures in Joan Richardson's reading of "Sea
Surface" as having Stevens's sexuality as its "true subject". The
prelude describes ("most hermetically") the period preceding sexual
climax. The reference to a piano is explained by the fact that his
mother and his wife, Elsie, played the piano.  "For him, the piano and
other keyboard instruments are always attached to something magical
connected with the idea of beauty and the allure of the female, as,
for example, in "Peter Quince at the Clavier," Richardson writes, "
Accordingly, the machine of ocean, his projection, is now `tranced,'
carried away by the rapture of the `uncertain green... as a prelude
holds and holds."

Richardson continues:

He imaginatively records both his sensations and those of his
wife. The female is felt by him as "silver petals of white blooms/
Unfolding in the water," and he, in his maleness, is "feeling sure/ of
the milk within the saltiest spurge." He goes on to express the
feelings of both of them throughout this section and in part of the
next. The climax itself is described as, "The sea unfolding in the
sunken clouds/ Oh! [marking the surprise of the moment of climax]
C'était mon extase et mon amour."

Richardson explicitly invokes Stevens's distinction between the true
subject of a poem and the poetry of the subject, in order to justify a
reading that dwells on what she takes to be the true subject. She writes,

In closing, I offer the following observations taken from "The
Irrational Element in Poetry:" "One is always writing about two things
at the same time in poetry and it is this that produces the tension
characteristic of poetry. One is the true subject and the other is the
poetry of the subject. The difficulty of sticking to the true subject,
when it is the poetry of the subject that is paramount in one's mind,
need only be mentioned to be understood."

Buttel does not draw the distinction, but he implicitly focuses on the
poetry of the subject, the "Poetry of sky and sea" in the concluding
two stanzas, discussing not deep psychology but rather the syntactical
and semantic features of Stevens's style.

The verse moves fluently from line to line, and the variations
intensify the exultation in the open-air vividness and splendor of
the seascape and skyscape....the combination of accents and
alliteration in "clouds came clustering," with "came" in this context
picking up a stress, heightens the impressiveness and drama produced
by the image of the "sovereign" cloud masses "clustering" -- just the
right word in meaning and sound -- into transitory form. The metrical
regularity of the following sentence, abetted by the repetition of
sound in "conch" and "conjuration," contributes to the majestic
authority of the note sounded by Triton. The suspended moment of
turning is caught in the hovering emphasis on "green blooms turning,"
even though the long spondee adds an extra accent to the line; and
this prepares for the immense satisfactionn of "clearing
opalescence" -- the jewel-like iridescence dissolving into an
instant of transfiguring clarity. Such effects lead up to the
triumphant finality of the concluding line, where the partial stress
on "Came" and the accents on the syllables beginning with f
heighten the finality. The series of unstressed syllables in the
penultimate foot not only increases the force of "freshest" but also
helps to convey the ongoing quality of the transfigurations which are
not static, even at the moment when poetic insight draws heaven and
sea into a unity.

Buttel's foregrounding of Stevens's craftsmanship, especially with
reference to syntactic and semantic innovation, is also the approach
favored by Helen Vendler and those inspired by her scholarship. About "Sea Surface Full of Clouds", she writes, "in his witty moments, Stevens practices legerdemain with the world's `reality' and produces a fantasia of shifting possibles, the brilliant changes of `Sea Surface Full of Clouds'." Significantly, this reference occurs in the midst of a long discussion of Stevens's use of grammatical particles like "if" and "as if" in order to achieve the effect of "something half-glimpsed, half-seen, and that is, finally, what Stevens achieves over and over: if he has a dogma, it is the dogma of the shadowy, the ephemeral, the barely perceived, the iridescent."

Notes

References 

 Buttel, Robert. Wallace Stevens: The Making of Harmonium. 1967: Princeton University Press
 Richardson, Joan. "A Reading of ‘Sea Surface Full of Clouds’". Wallace Stevens Journal Fall 1982.
 Putnam, Phoebe. “ ‘Shall I uncrumple this much-crumpled thing?’: Wallace Stevens’ Poetics of Sequence in ‘Sea Surface Full of Clouds.’ ” Wallace Stevens Journal 31.1 (Spring 2007): 43–58
 Vendler, Helen. On Extended Wing. 1969: Oxford University Press.

1924 poems
American poems
Poetry by Wallace Stevens